Valeri Konstantinovich Sarychev (born 12 January 1960), also known as Shin Eui-son, is a former Tajikistani footballer who played as a goalkeeper. He is regarded as one of the greatest K League goalkeepers of all time. In 2000, he gained South Korean nationality.

Club career
Sarychev started his senior career in Pamir Dushanbe, the Soviet second division club. He spent his heyday in Torpedo Moscow and reached the Soviet Cup final five times with Torpedo. He played for Seongnam Ilhwa Chunma and Anyang LG Cheetahs in South Korea's K League. Since 1999, the K League Federation made a new regulation which bans the use of foreign goalkeepers because the other clubs excessively employed foreign goalkeepers after watching his performances. He became a naturalized South Korean in 2000 and named his Korean name "Shin Eui-son"  which is his nickname and means the "Hand of God". He had a retirement ceremony on 1 May 2005 and became a goalkeeper coach after retirement. He won one Asian Club Championship and four K Leagues in South Korea and was selected as the goalkeeper of the K League 30th Anniversary Best XI in 2013.

International career
In August 1997, the Tajikistani national team were to take 16 players to South Korea to face their national team, but due to missing passports, only 12 players traveled. As a result, the Tajikistan Football Federation called upon Sarychev, as well as Vitaliy Parakhnevych who were playing in the K League.

Personal life
He acquired Korean citizenship in the year 2000, after being encouraged to do so by Cho Kwang-rae, the then manager of FC Anyang (currently FC Seoul). He is married to Olga Sarycheva and has a daughter and a son. Shin neither drinks nor smokes, and his only hobby is listening to music. He has a collection of 700 LP records at home, including complete collections of the Beatles and Genesis albums.

After acquiring Korean citizenship he founded the Guri Shin clan.

Career statistics

Club

International

Honours 
Torpedo Moscow
Soviet Cup: 1985–86

Ilhwa Chunma
K League 1: 1993, 1994, 1995
Korean League Cup: 1992
Asian Club Championship: 1995
Asian Super Cup: 1996
Afro-Asian Club Championship: 1996

Anyang LG Cheetahs
K League 1: 2000
Korean Super Cup: 2001
Asian Club Championship runner-up: 2001–02

Individual
Soviet Goalkeeper of the Year: 1991
K League 1 Best Defender/Goalkeeper: 1992, 1994
K League 1 Best XI: 1992, 1993, 1994, 1995, 2000, 2001
K League 30th Anniversary Best XI: 2013

References

External links 
 
 
 The Legends of K-League : K-리그 역사의 한 페이지를 장식하다 – 신의손 ①  
 The Legends of K-League : K-리그 역사의 한 페이지를 장식하다 – 신의손 ②  

1960 births
Living people
Tajikistani people of Russian descent
South Korean people of Russian descent
Association football goalkeepers
Soviet footballers
Tajikistani footballers
Tajikistani expatriate footballers
Soviet Top League players
CSKA Pamir Dushanbe players
PFC CSKA Moscow players
FC Torpedo Moscow players
Seongnam FC players
FC Seoul players
FC Seoul non-playing staff
K League 1 players
Tajikistani expatriate sportspeople in South Korea
Expatriate footballers in South Korea
Tajikistan international footballers
Russian expatriates in South Korea
Naturalized citizens of South Korea